Jakub Culek (born September 7, 1992) is a Czech professional ice hockey player. Culek was selected by the Ottawa Senators in the 3rd round (76th overall) of the 2010 NHL Entry Draft.

References

1992 births
Living people
Binghamton Senators players
Cape Breton Screaming Eagles players
Czech ice hockey left wingers
Elmira Jackals (ECHL) players
Evansville IceMen players
HC Plzeň players
Ottawa Senators draft picks
Rimouski Océanic players
People from Klatovy
Sportspeople from the Plzeň Region
Czech expatriate ice hockey players in the United States
Czech expatriate ice hockey players in Canada